Kurtan is a village in the Lori Province of Armenia.

Gallery

References 
 
 World Gazeteer: Armenia – World-Gazetteer.com

External links

Populated places in Lori Province